Karakoyun is an abandoned village in the Gegharkunik Province of Armenia.

References

Former populated places in Gegharkunik Province